Sumo was introduced as an official World Games sport at the 2005 World Games in Duisburg. It had previously appeared as an invitational sport at the 2001 World Games in Akita.

Medalists

Men

-85 kg (lightweight)

-115 kg (middleweight)

+115 kg (heavyweight)

Open

Women

-65 kg (lightweight)

-80 kg (middleweight)

+80 kg (heavyweight)

Open

External links
Sports 123
2009 Games Schedule

 
Sports at the World Games
World Games